NGC 784 is a barred spiral galaxy about 16.0 Mly away in the constellation Triangulum. NGC 784 is located within the Virgo Supercluster.

References

External links

NGC 0784
NGC 0784
NGC 0784
0784
07671